Dr. Piatro Sadoŭski (born 1941) is a Belarusian linguist, politician and diplomat.

Between 1992 and 1994 Sadoŭski served as first ambassador of independent Belarus to Germany.

Before and after the appointment, Piatro Sadoŭski was a member of the parliament of Belarus from the Belarusian Popular Front.

In 1995, he participated in the hunger strike organized by the opposition parliament members as a protest against the initiation of the Referendum on new state symbols and on the status of the Belarusian language.

See also

 Embassy of Belarus, Berlin

References

1941 births
Living people
BPF Party politicians
Members of the Supreme Council of Belarus
Ambassadors of Belarus to Germany